John William Ward, 1st Earl of Dudley, PC, FRS (9 August 1781 – 6 March 1833), known as the Honourable John Ward from 1788 to 1823 and as the 4th Viscount Dudley and Ward from 1823 to 1827, was a British politician and slave holder. He served as Foreign Secretary from 1827 to 1828.

Background and education
Dudley was the son of William Ward, 3rd Viscount Dudley and Ward, and his wife Julia Bosville, and was educated at Oxford University (starting at Oriel College in 1798 and transferring to Corpus Christi College, Oxford as a Gentleman Commoner in 1800).

Political career
Dudley entered the House of Commons in 1802 as one of two representatives for Downton. He held this seat until 1803 and later represented Worcestershire from 1803 to 1806, Petersfield from 1806 to 1807, Wareham from 1807 to 1812, Ilchester from 1812 to 1819 and Bossiney from 1819 to 1823. The latter year he succeeded his father in the peerage and took his seat in the House of Lords.

In 1827 Ward was appointed Foreign Secretary under George Canning, a post he held also under Lord Goderich and the Duke of Wellington, resigning office in May 1828. In 1827 he was admitted to the Privy Council and created Viscount Ednam, of Ednam in the County of Roxburgh, and Earl of Dudley, of Dudley Castle in the County of Stafford. As foreign minister Ward was only a cipher; but he was a man of considerable learning and had some reputation as a writer and a talker. Dudley took an interest in the foundation of the University of London, and his Letters to Edward Copleston, the Bishop of Llandaff, were published by the bishop in 1840.

Slave holder
Dudley was associated with three different cases, he owned 665 slaves in Jamaica and his estate was awarded a £12,728 payment at the time (worth £ in ).

Personal life
Dudley died unmarried on 6 March 1833, aged 51. His two viscountcies and his earldom became extinct on his death while he was succeeded in his junior title of Baron Ward by his second cousin Reverend William Humble Ward.

Industries of the estate
As Lord of Dudley, John Ward inherited mineral bearing lands in the Black Country region of England which included coal and limestone mines and furnaces.  An agreement to construct a rail line was signed in 1827 by James Foster, a local ironmaster, and Francis Downing, the mineral agent of John William Ward. The line connected some of the coal pits owned by the Dudley estate to the Staffordshire and Worcestershire Canal.  The line opened in June 1829 and was operated by the early steam locomotive Agenoria. This line was later connected to a network of private railways owned by John Ward's successors, which became known as the Earl of Dudley’s Railway.

John William Ward inherited estates in Jamaica from his grandmother Mary, Viscountess Dudley and Ward, which included enslaved people. After emancipation of the slaves in 1833, the Dudley estate received compensation for the freed slaves (the Earl having died by this time).

Works
Letters from Ward to Helen D'Arcy Stewart were published as Letters to "Ivy" from the first Earl of Dudley (1905).

References

External links 

Alumni of Oriel College, Oxford
Alumni of Corpus Christi College, Oxford
British Secretaries of State for Foreign Affairs
British Secretaries of State
1
Members of the Privy Council of the United Kingdom
Ward, John William Ward, 1st Earl of Dudley
Ward, John William Ward, 1st Earl of Dudley
Ward, John William Ward, 1st Earl of Dudley
Ward, John William Ward, 1st Earl of Dudley
Ward, John William Ward, 1st Earl of Dudley
Ward, John William Ward, 1st Earl of Dudley
UK MPs who inherited peerages
UK MPs who were granted peerages
Ward, John William Ward, 1st Earl of Dudley
Earls in the Peerage of the United Kingdom
1781 births
1833 deaths
Members of the Parliament of the United Kingdom for constituencies in Cornwall
Fellows of the Royal Society
John
Recipients of payments from the Slavery Abolition Act 1833
Peers of the United Kingdom created by George IV